Super VGA (SVGA) is a broad term that covers a wide range of computer display standards that extended IBM's VGA specification.

When used as shorthand for a resolution, as VGA and XGA often are, SVGA refers to a resolution of 800×600.

History

In the late 1980s, after the release of IBM's VGA, third-party manufacturers began making graphics cards based on its specifications with extended capabilities. As these cards grew in popularity they began to be referred to as "Super VGA."

This term was not an official standard, but a shorthand for enhanced VGA cards which had become common by 1988. One card that explicitly used the term was Genoa's SuperVGA HiRes.

Super VGA cards broke compatibility with the IBM VGA standard, requiring software developers to provide specific display drivers and implementations for each card their software could operate on. Initially, the heavy restrictions this placed on software developers slowed the uptake of Super VGA cards, which motivated VESA to produce a unifying standard, the VESA BIOS Extensions (VBE), first introduced in 1989, to provide a common software interface to all cards implementing the VBE specification.

Eventually, graphics adapters under the Super VGA umbrella would support an innumerable quantity of modes.

Specifications 
The Super VGA standardized the following resolutions:
  640×400 or  640×480 with 256 colors
 800×600 with 24-bit color depth
 1024×768 with 24-bit color depth
 1280×1024 with 24-bit color depth 

SVGA uses the same DE-15 VGA connector as the original standard, and otherwise operates over the same cabling and interfaces as VGA.

Early manufacturers 
Some early Super VGA manufacturers and some of their models, where available:
 Ahead Technologies (Not related to Nero AG, formerly Ahead Software)
 Amdek: VGA ADAPTER/132 (Tseng Labs chipset)
 AST Research, Inc.: VGA Plus (rebranded Paradise)
 ATI Technologies: VIP (82C451), VGA Wonder
 Chips and Technologies: 82C451
 Cirrus Logic: CL-GD410/420
 Compaq: VGC Board (Paradise chipset)
 Everex
 Genoa Systems: Genoa VGA 5100-5400 (ET3000)
 Orchid Technology: Designer VGA (ET3000), Pro Designer Plus
 Western Digital's Paradise Inc.: VGA Plus (PVGA1), VGA Plus 16, VGA Pro
 Sigma Designs: SigmaVGA (ET3000)
 STB Systems: VGA Extra/EM (ET3000),  V-RAM VGA
 Willow: VGA-TV/Publisher's, VGA-TV + Genlock
 Trident Microsystems: TVGA8800, TVGA8900, and TVGA9000 series

References 

Computer display standards
VESA